Hollywood is the only solo studio album by American hip hop recording artist Flavor Flav. It was released on October 31, 2006 through Draytown Records, being in production for at least seven years with the oldest track being "Hot 1" first released as a single in 1999. Production was mostly handled by Flav' himself with Charles "Cha Lo" Hester, Clint "Payback" Sands, Craig Williams, Producers Coalition, Andrew Williams, Cha Cho, Derrik Blocker, Kyle Hudnall, and Tracy Pierce. It features the lone guest appearance from Smooth B. The album reached No. 44 on the Billboard Top Heatseekers chart and No. 80 on the Billboard Top R&B/Hip-Hop Albums chart.

The song "Unga Bunga Bunga" appeared in a season four episode of Breaking Bad. The songs "Flavor Man" and "Col-Leepin" later appeared on Public Enemy's 2007 album How You Sell Soul to a Soulless People Who Sold Their Soul?.

Track listing

Charts

References

External links

2006 debut albums
Flavor Flav albums